This list of historical markers installed by the National Historical Commission of the Philippines (NHCP) in Western Visayas (Region VI) is an annotated list of people, places, or events in the region that have been commemorated by cast-iron plaques issued by the said commission. The plaques themselves are permanent signs installed in publicly visible locations on buildings, monuments, or in special locations.

While many Cultural Properties have historical markers installed, not all places marked with historical markers are designated into one of the particular categories of Cultural Properties.

This historical marker for The Code of Kalantiaw in Batan, installed on December 8, 1956, remained in place after William Henry Scott in 1968 proved that Datu Kalantiaw was a hoax and through a resolution that was issued by the National Historical Institute (NHI) in 2004.

This article lists one hundred and forty-three (143) markers from the Western Visayas Region.

Aklan
This article lists twenty-one (22) markers from the Province of Aklan.

Antique
This article lists eight (8) markers from the Province of Antique.

Capiz
This article lists five (6) markers from the Province of Capiz.

Guimaras
This article lists one (1) marker from the Province of Guimaras.

Iloilo
This article lists fifty-nine (59) markers from the Province of Iloilo.

Negros Occidental
This article lists forty-seven (47) markers from the Province of Negros Occidental.

See also
List of Cultural Properties of the Philippines in Western Visayas

References

Footnotes

Bibliography 

A list of sites and structures with historical markers, as of 16 January 2012
A list of institutions with historical markers, as of 16 January 2012

External links
A list of sites and structures with historical markers, as of 16 January 2012
A list of institutions with historical markers, as of 16 January 2012
National Registry of Historic Sites and Structures in the Philippines
Policies on the Installation of Historical Markers

Western Visayas
Western Visayas